Cambarus georgiae, the Little Tennessee crayfish, is a species of crayfish in the family Cambaridae. It is found in Georgia and North Carolina.

The IUCN conservation status of Cambarus georgiae is "LC", least concern, with no immediate threat to the species' survival. This status was last reviewed in 2010.

References

Further reading

 
 
 

Cambaridae
Articles created by Qbugbot
Freshwater crustaceans of North America
Crustaceans described in 1981
Taxa named by Horton H. Hobbs Jr.